İkinci Yeddioymaq (also, Yeddioymak, Yeddioymak Vtoroye, and Yeddy-Oymag Vtoroye) is a village and municipality in the Masally Rayon of Azerbaijan.

Demographics
Currently, the municipality has a population of 1,070.

References 

Populated places in Masally District